Sushanta Mahato is an Indian politician. He is a member of All India Trinamool Congress. In May 2021, he was elected as MLA of West Bengal Legislative Assembly from Baghmundi Constituency. He is from Kotshila.

References 

Trinamool Congress politicians from West Bengal
Living people
People from Purulia district
West Bengal MLAs 2021–2026
Year of birth missing (living people)